Bolmantalate (developmental code name LY-38851 or Lilly 38851), also known as 19-nortestosterone 17β-adamantoate (or nandrolone adamantoate), is an androgen and anabolic steroid and a nandrolone ester which was synthesized and developed by Eli Lilly in 1865 but was never marketed.

See also
 List of androgen esters § Nandrolone esters

References

Abandoned drugs
Adamantanes
Androgens and anabolic steroids
Estranes
Nandrolone esters
Progestogens
Testosterone